I Wanta Sing is an album by country singer George Jones. It was released in 1977 on the Epic record label.

Background
In the few years following his divorce from Tammy Wynette, Jones career began to sputter; his first two solo albums, 1975's Memories of Us and 1976's The Battle, did not crack the top 20 on Billboard'''s country albums chart.  Things turned around briefly with Alone Again in 1976, which boasted the hit single "Her Name Is", but I Wanta Sing, his only album of 1977, stalled on the charts at number 38.  Two singles, "Old King Kong" and "If I Could Put Them All Together", also failed to crack the top 20.  Part of the reason for the album's failure was Jones's unreliability at the time, as his personal life began to unravel.  The singer had signed a management deal with a local hustler named Shug Baggot, who would later do time for cocaine trafficking.  George, who had long indulged in amphetamines and whiskey, was soon addicted to cocaine as well, and the drug would increase Jones's already considerable paranoia.  Beset with money problems, he began missing shows and other personal appearances, although he made several television spots to plug his new LP, looking dapper singing "If I Could Put Them All Together" on Marty Robbins's television show and taking part in a medley with Robbins and Faron Young.  The single only made it to number 24.

Composition
Perhaps to combat all the bad publicity and disturbing stories that were beginning to emerge about Jones, producer Billy Sherrill loaded I Wanta Sing with songs that are predominantly lighthearted.  In his autobiography I Lived To Tell It All, Jones confessed "I usually let whatever producer I was working for select the songs, then I selected from his selections.  I'd usually pick ten from about twenty-five prospective songs.  Why not?  I wasn't writing myself anymore, and my producer, whoever he happened to be at the time, always brought me songs from the best writers in Nashville."  The title track (the only song on the album Jones did have a hand in writing) features snippets of songs by his favorite singers, such as "The Great Speckled Bird" by Roy Acuff and "Always Late With Your Kisses" by Lefty Frizzell.  Numbers like "Please Don't Sell Me Anymore Whiskey Tonight" and "They've Got Millions in Milwaukee" seem to coyly play up Jones hard drinking reputation.

"They've Got Millions in Milwaukee" is a cover of a Larry Chesier song from 1976.  "I Love You So Much It Hurts" is a cover of a Floyd Tillman song from 1946 that was also recorded by Merle Haggard in 1977. "Bull Mountain Lad" is a cover of a Wild Bill Emerson song from his 1976 album, Bull Mountain Lad.

In 2011, the album was paired (somewhat uncomfortably) with Jones's 1972 Epic debut George Jones (We Can Make It)'' and reissued with bonus tracks.

Track listing
 "I Wanta Sing" (George Jones, Earl Montgomery, Ernie Rowell)
 "Please Don't Sell Me Anymore Whiskey Tonight" (Jody Emerson, Ronal McCown)
 "They've Got Millions in Milwaukee" (Larry Chesier, Glenn Sutton)
 "If I Could Put Them All Together (I'd Have You)" (Even Stevens) 
 "I Love You So Much It Hurts" (Floyd Tillman)
 "Rest in Peace" (George Richey, Billy Sherrill)
 "Bull Mountain Lad" ("Wild" Bill Emerson, Jody Emerson)
 "Old King Kong" (Sammy Lyons)
 "You've Got The Best of Me Again" (Ernie Rowell, Bob House)
 "It's a 10–33 (Let's Get Jesus on the Line)" (Earl Montgomery, Alvin McLendon, Al Stancil)

Personnel
George Jones – vocals
Cliff Parker – electric guitar
Ray Edenton – acoustic guitar
Jim Vest, Pete Drake – steel guitar
Henry Strzelecki – bass
Buddy Spicher – fiddle
Hargus "Pig" Robbins – piano
Charlie McCoy – harmonica
Jerry Carrigan – drums

References 

1977 albums
George Jones albums
Albums produced by Billy Sherrill
Epic Records albums